On 7 May 2022, a school in Bilohorivka, Luhansk Oblast, was bombed by Russian forces during the Battle of Sievierodonetsk in the 2022 Russian invasion of Ukraine. The death of at least two people was confirmed while authorities said the actual death toll was close to 60.

About ninety people were sheltering inside the building's basement at the time,  which President Volodymyr Zelenskyy said was the majority of the village's population. The building was hit by a Russian airstrike, setting the building on fire and trapping large numbers of people inside.

Aftermath
At least 30 people were rescued. Two people were confirmed to have been killed, but Governor of Luhansk Oblast Serhiy Haidai said that the 60 remaining people were believed to have been killed.

Reactions 
The attack was condemned by the Ukrainian Foreign Ministry, and UN secretary-general Antonio Guterres, who said he was "appalled" by the attack.

Liz Truss, the British foreign secretary, said that she was "horrified" and described the attack as constituting war crimes.

References

2022 fires in Europe
2022 murders in Europe
2020s building bombings
Airstrikes conducted by Russia
Airstrikes during the 2022 Russian invasion of Ukraine
Attacks on buildings and structures in 2022
Attacks on buildings and structures in Ukraine
Attacks on schools in Europe
Building bombings in Europe
History of Luhansk Oblast
May 2022 crimes in Europe
May 2022 events in Ukraine
Russian war crimes in Ukraine
School bombings
War crimes during the 2022 Russian invasion of Ukraine
21st-century mass murder in Ukraine
Mass murder in 2022